Sir Gerald Reece  (10 January 1897 – 14 October 1985) was a British writer and colonial administrator. He served as Governor of the British Somaliland Protectorate from 1948 until February 1954.

Early life
Gerald Recce was born in 1897 and as soon as he reached the age of eighteen, he volunteered for service in the British Army. He served on the Western Front, in France and Belgium.

On being demobilised, he qualified as a solicitor. From 1921 to 1925 he practised law in London but office life was rather dull after his war-service and he gave up the safe career for the unpredictability of colonial service.

Career
Reece began his colonial career in 1925 in Kenya Colony. In March 1925 he was appointed the Assistant District Commissioner (DC) for North Kavirondo District. This was more of a probation post, to determine his fitness for more remote and unsupervised postings and after six months he received a transfer. The new appointment was in the West Suk District of Kerio Province.

He was affiliated with the Royal African Society and authored
The Horn of Africa for the Royal Institute of International Affairs in October 1954 (Vol. 30, #4, pp. 440–449 ).

Family
He married Alys Tracy (born 13 March 1912 - died 18 January 1995) in 1936. Alys, Lady Reece was herself awarded the MBE.

References

External links
 
 
 

1897 births
1985 deaths
British Africanists
British non-fiction writers
Commanders of the Order of the British Empire
Deputy Lieutenants of East Lothian
Knights Commander of the Order of St Michael and St George
Place of birth missing
Governors of British Somaliland
British male writers
20th-century non-fiction writers
Male non-fiction writers